The music of the Harry Potter film series was recorded and released in conjunction with the post-production and releases of each of the eight corresponding films. The scores were composed by John Williams, Patrick Doyle, Nicholas Hooper, and Alexandre Desplat. Though Williams only scored the first three films, several motifs that he created have been reprised and incorporated into later scores; in particular Hedwig's Theme, which can be heard in all eight films. Other musicians credited with writing source music include Jarvis Cocker, The Ordinary Boys, and Nick Cave and the Bad Seeds. Jeremy Soule and James Hannigan wrote the music for the Harry Potter video games.

Overview

Themes and motifs 

Throughout the series, each composer created themes for particular characters, items, locations, and ideas. Several themes can be heard in films subsequent to the one they were written for, although very few lasted for the entire film series.

First appearance in The Philosopher's Stone

First appearance in The Chamber of Secrets

First appearance in The Prisoner of Azkaban

First appearance in The Goblet of Fire

First appearance in The Order of the Phoenix

First appearance in The Half-Blood Prince

First appearance in The Deathly Hallows – Part 1

First appearance in The Deathly Hallows – Part 2

References 

 
Film music by media franchise
Harry Potter lists
Compositions by John Williams